Melaleuca pityoides, commonly known as alpine bottlebrush, is a plant in the family Myrtaceae, and is endemic to the higher areas of south eastern Australia. Some Australian state herbaria continue to use the name Callistemon pityoides. It is a shrub, often occurring in dense thickets, with hard bark, silvery-grey new growth, almost cylindrical leaves and spikes of flowers that are usually a shade of yellow.

Description
The leaf veins and oil glands are indistinct. The young leaves and branches are often densely covered with silky hairs.

The flowers are golden-yellow to cream, sometimes tinged with pink or green, and are arranged in short spikes on the ends of branches which continue to grow after flowering.

Taxonomy and naming
This species was first formally described in 1883 by Victorian Government Botanist Ferdinand von Mueller, who gave it the name Callistemon pityoides in Australian Chemist and Druggist, based on material gathered from the environs of the Ovens River and "Dumaresque River". He first mentioned Melaleuca pithyoides without description in 1853 in his First General Report of the Government Botanist on the Vegetation of the Colony in 1853. Mueller had collected non-flowering plant material from Mount Buffalo on an expedition earlier that year.

The name was changed to Melaleuca pityoides in 2006 by Lyndley Craven in Novon. The specific epithet (pityoides) is from the Greek pitys meaning “pine” and εἶδος (eîdos) meaning "likeness”, referring to the similarity of the leaves of this species with those of some kinds of pine trees.

Distribution and habitat
This melaleuca occurs from the Border Ranges district in the far south east of Queensland, south through the Northern, Central and Southern Tablelands of New South Wales and the highlands of eastern Victoria. It grows in swampy heath and rocky streams, often forming thickets to the exclusion of other species.

Use in horticulture
Melaleuca pityoides is sometimes cultivated as Callistemon pityoides. It grows well in cold climates, including in the United Kingdom, preferring heavier soils and can tolerate poor drainage.

References

pityoides
Flora of New South Wales
Flora of Queensland
Flora of Victoria (Australia)
Plants described in 1883
Taxa named by Ferdinand von Mueller